NA-140 Pakpattan-II is a constituency for the National Assembly of Pakistan. It mainly comprises Arifwala Tehsil, along with some Kalyana patwar circles of Pakpattan Tehsil.

Members of Parliament

2018-2022: NA-146 Pakpattan-II

Election 2002 

General elections were held on 10 Oct 2002. Junaid Mumtaz Joiya of PML-Q won by 58,699 votes.

Election 2008 

General elections were held on 18 Feb 2008. Rana Zahid Hussain Khan of PML-N won by 66,418 votes.

Election 2013 

General elections were held on 11 May 2013. Rana Zahid Hussain of PML-N won by 87,209 votes and became the  member of National Assembly.

Election 2018 

General elections were held on 25 July 2018.

See also
NA-139 Pakpattan-I
NA-141 Sahiwal-I

References

External links 
Election result's official website

NA-166